Menkhaure Snaaib was an Egyptian pharaoh during the Second Intermediate Period between the Middle Kingdom and New Kingdom at the end of the Middle Bronze Age.



Attestations

Stela CG 20517
In Abydos (Kom es-Sultan) a stela dedicated to the worship of the god Min-Horus-nakht dating to the reign of Snaaib was found. It is a painted limestone stele "of exceptionally crude quality". The stele gives the nomen, prenomen, and Horus names of the king. It also shows him wearing the Khepresh crown and adoring the god Min. 

Another ruler wearing the Khepresh Crown during this period was Neferhotep III.

Theories
According to Egyptologists Kim Ryholt and Darrell Baker he was a king of the Abydos Dynasty, although they leave his position within the dynasty undetermined. Alternatively, Jürgen von Beckerath sees Snaaib as a king reigning near the end of the 13th Dynasty.

In his study of the Second Intermediate Period, Ryholt elaborates on the idea originally proposed by Detlef Franke that following the collapse of the 13th Dynasty with the conquest of Memphis by the Hyksos, an independent kingdom centered on Abydos arose in Middle Egypt. The Abydos Dynasty thus designates a group of local kinglets reigning for a short time in central Egypt. Ryholt notes that Snaaib is only attested by his stele from Abydos and may thus belong to this dynasty. This conclusion is shared by Darrell Baker but not by von Beckerath, who places Snaaib near the end of the 13th Dynasty.

References 

17th-century BC Pharaohs
Pharaohs of the Abydos Dynasty
Egyptian Museum